The 1930 Brunswick state election was held on 14 September 1930 to elect the 40 members of the Landtag of the Free State of Brunswick.

Results

References 

Brunswick
Elections in Lower Saxony